Fernão Álvares da Maia (c.1390-1449) was a Portuguese nobleman, Lord of Pena, Aguiar. and  Trofa.

Biography 

Fernão was born in Lisbon, Kingdom of Portugal, son of Álvaro Gonçalves da Maia. He was married to Guiomar de Sá, daughter of Gonçalo de Sá (Lord of Aguiar) and Isabel Gil de Magalhães. The Sá family were descendant of Giacomo Sciarra della Colonna (senator of Rome), member of the prestigious Colonna family. 
 
Supporter of the cause of Peter, Duke of Coimbra, Fernão Álvares da Maia went towards Lisbon, where participated in the Battle of Alfarrobeira. Maia died in combat on 20 May 1449.

References 

1400s births
1449 deaths
15th-century Portuguese people
Medieval Portuguese nobility
People from Vila Franca de Xira